Michal Franek (born 18 January 1967) is a Slovak boxer. He competed at the 1988 Summer Olympics and the 1992 Summer Olympics.

References

External links
 

1967 births
Living people
Slovak male boxers
Czechoslovak male boxers
Olympic boxers of Czechoslovakia
Boxers at the 1988 Summer Olympics
Boxers at the 1992 Summer Olympics
Sportspeople from Žilina
Light-middleweight boxers